The Lovers of Ravello (Italian: Gli amanti di Ravello) is a 1951 Italian melodrama film directed by Francesco De Robertis and starring Lida Baarova, Gabriele Ferzetti and Carlo Ninchi.

The film's sets were designed by the art director Alfredo Montori.

Main cast
Lida Baarova as Ida
Gabriele Ferzetti as Sandro Deodata
Leonora Ruffo as Bruna Falchi
Carlo Ninchi as Matteo
Olga Solbelli as  governante
Rino Salviati as Mario
Nino Milano as Gennarino
 Alberto Nucci as Dario 
 Ivana Ferri as Ragazza 
 Cesira Vianello as Ispettrice 
 Aristide Spelta as Arciprete 
 Attilio Tosato as Amministratore

References

Bibliography
 Enrico Lancia & Roberto Poppi. Le attrici: dal 1930 ai giorni nostri. Gremese Editore, 2003.

External links 
 

1950s Italian-language films
1951 films
Films directed by Francesco De Robertis
Films set in Campania
1951 drama films
Italian drama films
Ravello
Melodrama films
Italian black-and-white films
1950s Italian films